Problepsis rorida is a moth of the  family Geometridae. It is found in Malawi.

References

Moths described in 1932
Scopulini
Moths of Africa